Cubana de Aviación Flight 389 (CU389/CUB389) was a scheduled domestic passenger flight, flying from the  Old Mariscal Sucre International Airport in Quito to Simón Bolívar International Airport (currently renamed as José Joaquín de Olmedo International Airport) in Guayaquil, operated by Cuban flag carrier Cubana de Aviación. On 29 August 1998, the aircraft operating the flight, a Tupolev Tu-154M overran the runway, smashing buildings and crashed into a soccer field in Quito while taking off from the airport. The aircraft burst into flames and 70 people on board were killed. A total of 10 people on the ground, including children, were killed.

Accident
Flight 389 was preparing for departure. During the first engine start, a pneumatic valve was blocked. The problem was rectified and two engines were started with ground power. During its taxi, the third engine was started. Flight 389 later obtained their take-off clearance and started their roll. The first and the second take-off attempt failed. It then attempted its third take off. When Flight 389 reached VR speed, the nose of the aircraft wouldn't lift (rotate). Even though the crew initiated a rejected take-off, the aircraft overran the runway, narrowly missed the heavily traveled avenue at the end of the airport runway in a middle-class residential neighborhood, slammed into a wall, clipped an auto mechanic shop, smashed into two houses and plowed into a soccer field. At the time, many people including children were playing on the field. The aircraft exploded and burst into flames.

Rescuers reached the crash site and started to evacuate survivors from the crash site. Explosions could be heard repeatedly after the crash. Firefighters jets of water on the smoking ruins to prevent additional explosions and local authorities cordoned off the crash site and searched for a missing local resident. Many people on the ground went missing in the crash. A mother stated that her three children were missing after the crash. 26 injured people were rushed to three hospitals, with 15 of them onto the Quito Metropolitan Hospital. Survivors stated that some doors on the plane wouldn't open after impact and several survivors escaped from the fiery wreckage through a hole in the fuselage. Several people jumped from the plane while they were on fire. On Sunday, 30 August, Ecuadorian Red Cross stated that as many as 77 badly burned bodies have been recovered from the crash site. Five children playing on the field were killed as the plane plowed onto them.

Aircraft, passengers and crew
The aircraft was a Tupolev Tu-154M, serial number 85A720 and registered in Cuba as CU-T1264. The aircraft was carrying 91 people, consisting of 14 crew and 77 passengers. It was piloted by Mario Ramos (commander), Leonardo Díaz (co-pilot) and Carlos González (flight engineer). Most of the occupants were Ecuadorians, with some Argentinians, Italians, Jamaicans, Chileans and Cubans.

Aftermath
Shortly after the crash, Mariscal Sucre International Airport was closed and every flight operations were cancelled in response to the crash. Ecuadorian President Jamil Mahuad visited the crash site and expressed his solidarity to the next of kin and relatives of the victims of the crash. He ordered a full report into the cause of the crash and stated that he would build a new airport away from the city, as the airport had been criticised for being too close to a densely populated area.

See also

1996 Air Africa crash
Munich air disaster
LAPA Flight 3142
Tower Air Flight 41

References 

Accidents and incidents involving the Tupolev Tu-154
Airliner accidents and incidents caused by mechanical failure
Aviation accidents and incidents in 1998
Aviation accidents and incidents in Ecuador
August 1998 events in South America
1998 in Ecuador
1998 disasters in Ecuador